The Russian All-National Union (RONS; ; Russkiy obshchenatsionalnyy soyuz, RONS) - is a Russian Pan-Slavic Orthodox political movement which has been founded in 1990. From 1995 RONS took part in State and local elections and its representatives became the members of local parliaments in Irkutsk, Novosibirsk, Vladimir, and Tula Regions. The members of the organization represent RONS and Russian nationalist ideology in municipal legislatures in more than twelve regions of Russia, including in: Saint Petersburg, Nizhny  Novgorod, Stavropol, and Rostov.

RONS has often militated against the policies of the Yeltsin and Putin-Medvedevs governments, for example against the "propaganda of alcohol, smoking, aborts, homosexuality", and against various "immoral" programs on television and radio. It also sponsors youth sporting camps in summer periods.

RONS publishes the newspapers "Рубеж", "Отчизна", and other,  magazine "Третий Рим", the symbols: Celtic cross, Saint George the Winner, and exploits both kinds of Russian national banners: white-blue-red, and black-yellow-white.

The National Council of RONS includes 15 members. The chairman is Igor V. Artemov (Игорь Артёмов).

References

External links
Официальный сайт
РОНС-Медиа

1990 establishments in Russia
1990 establishments in the Soviet Union
Far-right political parties in Russia
Christian nationalism
Political parties in the Soviet Union
Russian Orthodox Church in Russia
Pan-Slavism